The Fort Peck Theatre was built as a temporary structure in 1934 in Fort Peck, Montana to serve as a movie theatre.  It is also known as the Fort Peck Summer Theatre.  The theater was designed in a pseudo-Swiss-chalet style as an amenity for the 50,000 U.S. Army Corps of Engineers workers and their families at the Fort Peck Dam project. The interior features open-truss wood construction, with handcrafted light fixtures fabricated in Corps of Engineers workshops. The theater survived to become a permanent facility, and in 2008 was in use as a community theater.

The building includes a stage, a 1209-seat auditorium, a lounge, a foyer, a lobby, a manager's office, and four dressing rooms.  It was designed and/or built by Eugene Frank Gilstrap and the C.F. Haglin Co.

Its NRHP nomination compares it to the architecturally significant Timberline Lodge in Oregon.

References

External links
Fort Peck Summer Theatre

Theatres completed in 1934
Cinemas and movie theaters in Montana
Tourist attractions in Valley County, Montana
1934 establishments in Montana
Theatres on the National Register of Historic Places in Montana
National Register of Historic Places in Valley County, Montana
Theatre
Swiss Chalet Revival architecture
United States Army Corps of Engineers